National Secondary Route 119, or just Route 119 (or ) is a National Road Route of Costa Rica, located in the Alajuela, Heredia provinces.

Description
In Alajuela province the route covers Alajuela canton (Río Segundo district).

In Heredia province the route covers Barva canton (Barva, San Roque districts), Santa Bárbara canton (San Juan district), Flores canton (Barrantes district).

References

Highways in Costa Rica